Agustín Casado Marcelo (born 21 May 1996) is a Spanish handball player for MT Melsungen and the Spanish national team. 

He represented Spain at the 2022 European Men's Handball Championship.

References

External links
 Agustín Casado Marcelo at European Handball Federation

1996 births
Living people
Spanish male handball players
21st-century Spanish people